Lauren Bacall (born Betty Joan Perske; September 16, 1924 – August 12, 2014) was an American actress. She was named the 20th-greatest female star of classic Hollywood cinema by the American Film Institute and received an Academy Honorary Award from the Academy of Motion Picture Arts and Sciences in 2009 in recognition of her contribution to the Golden Age of motion pictures. She was known for her alluring, sultry presence and her distinctive, husky voice. Bacall was one of the last surviving major stars from the Golden Age of Hollywood cinema.

Bacall began a career as a model for the Walter Thornton Model Agency before making her film debut at the age of 19 as the leading lady opposite her future husband Humphrey Bogart in To Have and Have Not (1944). She continued in the film noir genre with appearances alongside her new husband in The Big Sleep (1946), Dark Passage (1947), and Key Largo (1948), and she starred in the romantic comedies How to Marry a Millionaire (1953) with Marilyn Monroe and Betty Grable, and Designing Woman (1957) with Gregory Peck. She portrayed the female lead in Written on the Wind (1956) which is considered one of Douglas Sirk's seminal films. She starred alongside Paul Newman in the 1966 mystery film Harper. She co-starred with John Wayne in his final film The Shootist (1976) by Wayne's personal request. She also worked on Broadway in musicals, earning Tony Awards for Applause (1970) and Woman of the Year (1981). For her performance in The Mirror Has Two Faces (1996) she won a Golden Globe, a BAFTA, and a SAG award, and was nominated for an Academy Award.

During the final stage of her career she gained newfound success with a younger audience for major supporting roles in the films Misery (1990), Dogville (2003) and the English dubs of the animated films Howl's Moving Castle (2004) and Ernest & Celestine (2012).

Early life
Lauren Bacall was born Betty Joan Perske on September 16, 1924, in the Bronx, New York City, the only child of Natalie (née Weinstein-Bacal; 1901–1969), a secretary who later legally changed her surname to Bacal, and William Perske (1889–1982), who worked in sales. Both of her parents were Jewish. Her mother emigrated from Iași, Romania through Ellis Island. Her father was born in New Jersey to parents who were born in Valozhyn, a predominantly Jewish community in present-day Belarus.

Bacall's parents divorced when she was five, after which she no longer saw her father. She later took the Romanian form of her mother's last name, Bacall. She was close to her mother, who remarried to Lee Goldberg and moved to California after Bacall became a star. Through her father, Bacall was a relative of Shimon Peres (born Szymon Perski), the eighth prime minister and ninth president of Israel. Peres did not know about the relation until Bacall told him.

Bacall's family moved soon after her birth to Brooklyn's Ocean Parkway. Money from a wealthy family allowed Bacall to attend school at the Highland Manor Boarding School for Girls in Tarrytown, New York, a private boarding school founded by philanthropist Eugene Heitler Lehman, and at Julia Richman High School in Manhattan.

Early career and modeling

In 1941, Bacall took lessons at the American Academy of Dramatic Arts in New York, where she dated classmate Kirk Douglas. She worked as a theatre usher at the St. James Theatre and as a fashion model in department stores.

She made her acting debut on Broadway in 1942 at age 17 as a walk-on in Johnny 2 X 4. By then, she lived with her mother at 75 Bank Street, and in 1942, she was crowned Miss Greenwich Village.

As a teenage fashion model, Bacall appeared on the cover of Harper's Bazaar and in magazines such as Vogue. A 1948 article in Life magazine referred to her "cat-like grace, tawny blonde hair, and blue-green eyes." As she naturally had a high-pitched and nasal voice, she received lessons to help deepen it and was required to shout verses by Shakespeare for hours every day as part of her training.

Though Diana Vreeland is often credited with discovering Bacall for Harper's Bazaar, it was in fact Nicolas de Gunzburg who introduced Bacall to Vreeland. He had first met Bacall at a New York club called Tony's, where De Gunzburg suggested that Bacall visit his Harper's Bazaar office the next day. He then turned her over to Vreeland, who arranged for Louise Dahl-Wolfe to shoot Bacall in Kodachrome for the March 1943 cover.

The Harper's Bazaar cover caught the attention of "Slim" Keith, the wife of Hollywood producer and director Howard Hawks. Keith urged her husband to invite Bacall to take a screen test for his forthcoming film To Have and Have Not. Hawks asked his secretary to find more information about Bacall, but the secretary misunderstood and sent Bacall a ticket to travel to Hollywood for the audition.

Hollywood

1940s

After meeting Bacall in Hollywood, Hawks immediately signed her to a seven-year contract with a weekly salary of $100 and personally began to manage her career. He changed her first name to Lauren, and she chose Bacall, a variant of her mother's maiden name, as her screen surname. Slim Hawks also took Bacall under her wing, dressing Bacall stylishly and guiding her in matters of elegance, manners and taste. At Hawks' suggestion, Bacall was trained by a voice coach to speak with a lower and deeper voice instead of her normally high-pitched, nasal voice. As part of her training, Bacall was required to shout verses of Shakespeare for hours every day. Her voice was characterized as a "smoky, sexual growl" by most critics and a "throaty purr."

During her screen tests for To Have and Have Not (1944), Bacall was so nervous that, to minimize her quivering, she pressed her chin against her chest, faced the camera and tilted her eyes upward. This effect, which came to be known as "The Look", became another Bacall trademark, along with her sultry voice.

Bacall's character in the film used Slim Hawks' nickname, "Slim", and Bogart used Howard Hawks' nickname "Steve." The on-set chemistry between the two was immediate, according to Bacall. She and Bogart, who was married to Mayo Methot, began a romantic relationship several weeks into shooting.

Bacall's role in the script was originally much smaller, but during production, the part was revised and extended several times. After its release, To Have and Have Not catapulted Bacall into instant stardom, and her performance became the cornerstone of her star image that extended into popular culture at large, even influencing fashion as well as filmmakers and other actors.

Warner Bros. launched an extensive marketing campaign to promote the picture and to establish Bacall as a movie star. As part of the public-relations push, Bacall visited the National Press Club in Washington, D.C., on February 10, 1945, and sat on a piano as Vice President Harry S Truman played it.

After To Have and Have Not, Bacall appeared with Charles Boyer in Confidential Agent (1945), which was poorly received by critics. By her own estimation, she had been terribly miscast and the film could have caused considerable damage to her career, but her next performance as the mysterious, acid-tongued Vivian Rutledge in Hawks's film noir The Big Sleep (1946), co-starring Bogart, provided a quick career resurgence.

The Big Sleep laid the foundation for Bacall's status as an icon of film noir, with which she would be strongly associated for the rest of her career. She was often cast in roles that were variations of the independent and sultry femme fatale character of Vivian. As described by film scholar Joe McElhaney, "Vivian displays an almost total command of movement and gesture. She never crawls."

Bacall was cast with Bogart in two more films. In the film noir Dark Passage (1947), she played an enigmatic San Francisco artist. Bosley Crowther of The New York Times wrote: "Miss Bacall... generates quite a lot of pressure as a sharp-eyed, knows-what-she-wants girl." Bacall appeared in John Huston's melodramatic suspense film Key Largo (1948) with Bogart, Edward G. Robinson and Lionel Barrymore. In the film, according to film critic Jessica Kiang, "Bacall brings an edge of ambivalence and independence to the role that makes her character much more interesting than was written."

1950s

Bacall rejected scripts that she did not find interesting, and thereby earned a reputation as difficult. However, she further solidified her star status in the 1950s by appearing as the leading lady in a string of films that won favorable reviews.

Bacall was cast with Gary Cooper in Bright Leaf (1950) and as a two-faced femme fatale in Young Man with a Horn (1950), a jazz musical co-starring Kirk Douglas, Doris Day and Hoagy Carmichael.

From 1951 to 1952, Bacall costarred with Bogart in the syndicated action-adventure radio series Bold Venture.

Bacall starred in the first CinemaScope comedy, How to Marry a Millionaire (1953), a runaway hit among critics and at the box office that was directed by Jean Negulesco. She received positive notices for her turn as witty gold-digger Schatze Page. "First honors in spreading mirth go to Miss Bacall," wrote Alton Cook in the New York World-Telegram & Sun, "The most intelligent and predatory of the trio, she takes complete control of every scene with her acid delivery of viciously witty lines."

After the success of How to Marry a Millionaire, Bacall declined the opportunity to press her handprints and footprints in the Grauman's Chinese Theatre's famed cement forecourt. She felt that "anyone with a picture opening could be represented there, standards had been so lowered" and did not feel that she had yet achieved the status of a major star, and was thereby unworthy of the honor: "I want to feel I've earned my place with the best my business has produced."

Bacall was under contract to 20th Century-Fox. Following How to Marry a Millionaire, she appeared in yet another CinemaScope comedy directed by Negulesco, Woman's World (1954), which failed to match its predecessor's success at the box office.

A television version of Bogart's early film success The Petrified Forest was performed as a 1955 live installment of the weekly dramatic anthology Producers' Showcase, featuring Bogart in his original role of Duke Mantee and starring Bacall and Henry Fonda. In the late 1990s, Bacall donated the only known kinescope of the performance to the Museum of Television & Radio (now the Paley Center for Media), where it remains archived for viewing in New York City and Los Angeles.

Bacall starred in two feature films, The Cobweb and Blood Alley, both released in 1955. Directed by Vincente Minnelli, The Cobweb takes place at a mental institution where Bacall's character works as a therapist. It was her second collaboration with Charles Boyer, and the film also stars Richard Widmark and Lillian Gish. A New York Times critic wrote: "In the only two really sympathetic roles, Mr. Widmark is excellent and Miss Bacall shrewdly underplays."

Many film scholars consider Written on the Wind (1956), directed by Douglas Sirk, a landmark melodrama. Appearing with Rock Hudson, Dorothy Malone and Robert Stack, Bacall plays a career woman whose life is unexpectedly turned around by a family of oil magnates. Bacall wrote in her autobiography that she did not think much of her role, but reviews were favorable. Variety wrote:  "Bacall registers strongly as a sensible girl swept into the madness of the oil family."

While supporting Bogart as he suffered from terminal esophageal cancer, Bacall starred with Gregory Peck in Designing Woman (1957) to solid reviews. The musical comedy was her second feature directed by Minnelli and was released in New York on May 16, 1957, four months after Bogart's death on January 14.

Bacall appeared in two more films in the 1950s: the Negulesco-directed melodrama The Gift of Love (1958) with Robert Stack and the British adventure film North West Frontier (1959), which was a box-office hit.

1960s and 1970s
Bacall was seen in only a handful of films in the 1960s. She starred on Broadway in Goodbye, Charlie in 1959, and went on to a successful stage career in Cactus Flower (1965), Applause (1970) and Woman of the Year (1981). She won Tony Awards for her performances in Applause and Woman of the Year.

Applause was a musical version of the film All About Eve (1950), starring Bette Davis, Bacall's idol as a child. A young and unknown Bacall had met Davis years earlier in New York. After a performance of Applause, Davis visited Bacall backstage and told her, "You're the only one who could have played the part." Bacall would later win the Sarah Siddons Award in 1972 and 1984, an award inspired by the fictional trophy in All About Eve.

The few films in which Bacall appeared during this period were all-star vehicles such as Sex and the Single Girl (1964) with Henry Fonda, Tony Curtis and Natalie Wood; Harper (1966) with Paul Newman, Shelley Winters, Julie Harris, Robert Wagner and Janet Leigh; and Murder on the Orient Express (1974), with Ingrid Bergman, Albert Finney, Vanessa Redgrave, Martin Balsam and Sean Connery.

In 1964, Bacall appeared in two episodes of Craig Stevens's Mr. Broadway: first in "Take a Walk Through a Cemetery" with husband Jason Robards, Jr., and later as Barbara Lake in the episode "Something to Sing About" with Balsam.

In 1976, Bacall costarred in The Shootist with John Wayne, with whom she had worked in Blood Alley (1955).

1980s 
Bacall was featured in Robert Altman's comedy Health (1980), which underwent a troubled process of release after the change of the top management at 20th Century-Fox and saw a very limited release in theaters. The following year, she appeared in the thriller The Fan (1981). The film received mixed reviews, especially following the recent murder of John Lennon and the similarities of the plot to the real event, but Bacall's performance gained a favorable reception. Variety magazine wrote that Bacall and director Edward Bianchi "make the audience care what happens" to her character.

Bacall took a seven-year hiatus from films to perform on stage in Woman of the Year (1981) with costar Harry Guardino, for which she won her second Tony Award for Best Actress in a Musical, and other shows such as a 1985 adaptation of Tennessee Williams's Sweet Bird of Youth under the direction of Harold Pinter. She returned to film in 1988 with supporting roles in Danny Huston's Mr. North and Michael Winner's Appointment with Death. She also starred in the British thriller Tree of Hands (1989), based on a novel by Ruth Rendell, and in a television adaptation of the 1933 classic Dinner at Eight for Turner Television.

1990s 
In 1990, Bacall took a small but central role as James Caan's agent in Rob Reiner's Misery, based on the novel by Stephen King, and an important role in the British television movie A Little Piece of Sunshine, based on a novel by John le Carré. The following year, Bacall played the lead in the independent film A Star for Two (1991) with Anthony Quinn, Lila Kedrova and Jean-Pierre Aumont, and played a supporting role in All I Want for Christmas (1991).

In 1993, Bacall was very active in television, pairing again with her lifelong friend Gregory Peck and his daughter Cecilia Peck in Arthur Penn's television movie The Portrait, and costarring with an all-star European cast in A Foreign Field. She appeared in Robert Altman's Prêt-à-Porter (1994), an ensemble film set in Paris during fashion week. In 1995, she was cast in her friend Ingrid Bergman's role in From the Mixed-Up Files of Mrs. Basil E. Frankweiler, a television remake of the 1973 movie by the same title. Years earlier, Bergman had played the role in the film version of Cactus Flower (1969) that Bacall had played on Broadway in 1965. 

1996 was a pivotal year for Bacall's career. She was chosen by Barbra Streisand to play her mother in the romantic comedy The Mirror Has Two Faces, also starring Jeff Bridges, George Segal and Brenda Vaccaro. The reviews for her role were positive, and at age 72, she was nominated for the first time for a Best Supporting Actress Academy Award, after having won the Golden Globe. She was widely expected to win the Oscar, but she lost to Juliette Binoche for The English Patient.

Bacall received the Kennedy Center Honors in 1997, and she was voted one of the 25 most significant female movie stars in history in 1999 by the American Film Institute. Her film career saw something of a renaissance, and she attracted positive notices for her performances in high-profile projects such as Dogville (2003) and Birth (2004), both with Nicole Kidman, and in Howl's Moving Castle (2004) as the Witch of the Waste. She was a leading actress in Paul Schrader's The Walker (2007).

In 1999, Bacall starred on Broadway in a revival of Noël Coward's Waiting in the Wings. In the 2000s, she acted as a spokesman for the Tuesday Morning discount chain and produced a jewelry line. She was also a celebrity spokesman for High Point coffee and Fancy Feast cat food. In March 2006, she introduced a film montage dedicated to film noir at the 78th Academy Awards. She made a cameo appearance as herself on The Sopranos in the April 2006 episode "Luxury Lounge," during which her character was mugged by Christopher Moltisanti (Michael Imperioli).

Later years 

In September 2006, Bryn Mawr College awarded Bacall their Katharine Hepburn Medal, which recognizes "women whose lives, work, and contributions embody the intelligence, drive, and independence" of Hepburn. She delivered an address at the memorial service of Arthur M. Schlesinger Jr. at the Reform Club in London in June 2007. She finished her role in The Forger in 2009. The Academy of Motion Picture Arts and Sciences bestowed an honorary Academy Award upon Bacall at the inaugural Governors Awards on November 14, 2009.

In July 2013, Bacall expressed interest in the film Trouble Is My Business. In November, she joined the English-dubbed voice cast for StudioCanal's animated film Ernest & Celestine. Her final role was in 2014 as a guest voice appearance in the Family Guy episode "Mom's the Word."

Personal life

Relationships and family

On May 21, 1945, Bacall married Humphrey Bogart. Their wedding and honeymoon took place at Malabar Farm, Lucas, Ohio, the country home of Pulitzer Prize-winning author Louis Bromfield, a close friend of Bogart. At the time of the 1950 United States census, the couple were living at 2707 Benedict Canyon Drive in Beverly Hills with their son and nursemaid. Bacall is listed as Betty Bogart. She was married to Bogart until he died in 1957.

During the filming of The African Queen (1951), Bacall and Bogart became friends with Katharine Hepburn and Spencer Tracy. She began to mix in non-acting circles, becoming friends with the historian Arthur Schlesinger Jr. and the journalist Alistair Cooke. In 1952, she gave campaign speeches for Democratic presidential contender Adlai Stevenson. Along with other Hollywood figures, Bacall was a strong opponent of McCarthyism.

Bacall had a relationship with Frank Sinatra after Bogart's death. During an interview with Turner Classic Movies's Robert Osborne, Bacall stated that she had ended the romance, but, in her autobiography Lauren Bacall by Myself, she wrote that Sinatra ended the relationship abruptly after becoming upset that his marriage proposal had been leaked to the press, believing Bacall to be responsible. However, Bacall states in Lauren Bacall by Myself that when she was out with her friend Irving "Swifty" Lazar, they encountered the gossip columnist Louella Parsons, to whom Lazar revealed the news. Bacall wrote in By Myself that Sinatra only found out the truth years later.

Bacall then met and began a relationship with Jason Robards. Their wedding was originally scheduled to take place in Vienna, Austria, on June 16, 1961. The wedding plans were shelved after Austrian authorities refused to grant the couple a marriage license, due to Robards being unable to produce divorce documents from his previous marriage, and Bacall being unable to produce Humphrey Bogart's death certificate. They were also refused a marriage in Las Vegas, Nevada, due to similar documentation issues. On July 4, 1961, the couple drove to Ensenada, Mexico, where they wed. The couple divorced in 1969. According to Bacall's autobiography, she divorced Robards mainly because of his alcoholism.

Bacall had a romantic relationship with her Woman of the Year costar Harry Guardino in the early 1980s.

Bacall had two children with Bogart and one with Robards. Son Stephen Humphrey Bogart (born January 6, 1949) is a news producer, documentary film maker, and author who is named after Bogart's character in To Have and Have Not. Their daughter Leslie Howard Bogart (born August 23, 1952) is named after the actor Leslie Howard. A nurse and yoga instructor, she is married to Erich Schiffmann. In his 1995 memoir, Stephen Bogart wrote, "My mother was a lapsed Jew, and my father was a lapsed Episcopalian", and that he and his sister were raised Episcopalian "because my mother felt that would make life easier for Leslie and me during those post-World War II years". Sam Robards (born December 16, 1961), Bacall's son with Robards, is an actor.

Bacall wrote two autobiographies, Lauren Bacall by Myself (1978) and Now (1994). In 2006, the first volume of Lauren Bacall by Myself was reprinted as By Myself and Then Some with an extra chapter.

In a 1996 interview, Bacall, reflecting on her life, told the interviewer Jeremy Isaacs that she had been lucky: 
I had one great marriage, I have three great children and four grandchildren. I am still alive. I still can function. I still can work ... You just learn to cope with whatever you have to cope with. I spent my childhood in New York, riding on subways and buses. And you know what you learn if you're a New Yorker? The world doesn't owe you a damn thing."BBC – The Late Show – Face to Face: Lauren Bacall", Interview with Jeremy Isaacs, BBC, March 20, 1995

Political views

Bacall was a staunch liberal Democrat, and proclaimed her political views on numerous occasions. Bacall and Bogart were among about 80 Hollywood personalities to send a telegram protesting the House Un-American Activities Committee's investigations of Americans suspected of adhering to communism. The telegram said that investigating individuals' political beliefs violated the basic principles of American democracy. In October 1947, Bacall and Bogart traveled to Washington, D.C., along with a number of other Hollywood stars in a group that called itself the Committee for the First Amendment (CFA), which also included Danny Kaye, John Garfield, Gene Kelly, John Huston, Groucho Marx, Olivia De Havilland, Ira Gershwin, and Jane Wyatt.

She appeared alongside Humphrey Bogart in a photograph printed at the end of an article he wrote, titled "I'm No Communist", in the May 1948 edition of Photoplay magazine, written to counteract negative publicity resulting from his appearance before the House Committee. Bogart and Bacall distanced themselves from the Hollywood Ten, and said: "We're about as much in favor of Communism as J. Edgar Hoover."

Bacall campaigned for Democratic candidate Adlai Stevenson in the 1952 presidential election, accompanying him on motorcades along with Bogart, and flying east to help in the final laps of Stevenson's campaign in New York and Chicago. She also campaigned for Robert F. Kennedy in his 1964 run for the U.S. Senate.

In a 2005 interview with Larry King, Bacall described herself as "anti-Republican... A liberal. The L-word". She added that "being a liberal is the best thing on Earth you can be. You are welcoming to everyone when you're a liberal. You do not have a small mind."

Death
Bacall died on August 12, 2014, one month before her 90th birthday, at her longtime apartment in The Dakota, the Upper West Side building near Central Park in Manhattan. According to her grandson Jamie Bogart, Bacall died after suffering a massive stroke. She was confirmed dead at New York–Presbyterian Hospital. 

Bacall was interred at Forest Lawn Memorial Park in Glendale, California. At the time of her death, Bacall had an estimated $26.6 million estate. The bulk of her estate was divided among her three children: Leslie Bogart, Stephen Humphrey Bogart, and Sam Robards. Additionally, Bacall left $250,000 each to her youngest grandsons, the sons of Sam Robards, for college.

Filmography

Awards and nominations

Bibliography
 By Myself (1978)
 Now (1994)
 By Myself and Then Some (2005)

In popular culture
Film
 The 1980 television film Bogie, directed by Vincent Sherman and based on a book by Joe Hyams, tells the story of Bogart meeting Bacall while making To Have and Have Not in 1943, and beginning the affair with her that led to the dissolution of Bogart's marriage to Mayo Methot. Bacall is portrayed by Kathryn Harrold in the film; Kevin O'Connor plays Bogart; and Methot is played by Ann Wedgeworth.

Television
 She appeared in The Sopranos season six, episode 7 “Luxury Lounge” as herself.

Theatre
 The 1978 musical Evita (musical), music by Andrew Lloyd Webber and lyrics by Tim Rice, tells the story of Argentina's infamous first lady Eva Peron. In the song "Rainbow High," Eva sings the lyrics "I'm their savior. That's what they call me. So, Lauren Bacall me. Anything Goes."

Animation
 Bacall and Bogart are parodied in the Warner Brothers Merrie Melodies shorts Bacall to Arms (1946) and Slick Hare (1947).

Music

 Bacall and Bogart are referenced in Bertie Higgins' song "Key Largo" (1981).
 Bacall is referenced in The Clash's song "Car Jamming" (1982).
 Bacall and Bogart are referenced in Suzanne Vega's song "Freeze Tag" (1985).
 She is referenced in "Vogue", the 1990 song by Madonna. Bacall was the last to die of the celebrities mentioned in the lyrics.
 She is the subject of the song "Just Like Lauren Bacall" (2008) written by Kevin Roth.

Books

 Bacall and her Manhattan apartment are featured in The Dakota Scrapbook (2014), a photo-journalism volume on the history of the Dakota apartment building in New York City, and its famous residents over the years.
 In the novel Forgive Me, Leonard Peacock, a character named Lauren is often recognized by the protagonist, Leonard, as having a striking resemblance to Lauren Bacall.

Marshall Islands namesake
 The town of Laura—on the island of Majuro in the Marshall Islands—is one of several island towns code-named after the troops' favorite actresses by World War II U.S. forces.

See also
 Bogart and Bacall
 Bogart–Bacall syndrome
 List of actors with Academy Award nominations
 List of actors with Hollywood Walk of Fame motion picture stars

Explanatory notes

Citations

General and cited sources

External links

 
 
 
 Lauren Bacall at aenigma
 

1924 births
2014 deaths
20th-century American actresses
21st-century American actresses
Academy Honorary Award recipients
Actresses from New York City
American Academy of Dramatic Arts alumni
American film actresses
American musical theatre actresses
American people of Romanian-Jewish descent
American people of Russian-Jewish descent
American stage actresses
American television actresses
American voice actresses
Best Supporting Actress Golden Globe (film) winners
Burials at Forest Lawn Memorial Park (Glendale)
California Democrats
Cecil B. DeMille Award Golden Globe winners
César Honorary Award recipients
Female models from New York (state)
Jewish American actresses
Jewish female models
Julia Richman Education Complex alumni
Kennedy Center honorees
Models from New York City
National Book Award winners
New York (state) Democrats
Outstanding Performance by a Female Actor in a Supporting Role Screen Actors Guild Award winners
People from Holmby Hills, Los Angeles
People from the Upper West Side
Tony Award winners
Warner Bros. contract players
Writers from Manhattan
21st-century American Jews
United Service Organizations entertainers